Ayiranalloor  is a village in Kollam district in the state of Kerala, India.

Demographics
 India census, Ayiranalloor had a population of 13359 with 6494 males and 6865 females.

References

Villages in Kollam district